Francesco Jovine (9 October 1902 in Guardialfiera – 30 April 1950 in Rome) was an Italian writer and journalist. He is mostly known for the novels Signora Ava and Le terre del Sacramento.

References

1902 births
1950 deaths
20th-century Italian writers
20th-century Italian male writers